Gerald "Gerry" Ehrmann (born 18 February 1959 in Tauberbischofsheim, Baden-Württemberg) is a German football coach and former player who is a goalkeeping coach with 1. FC Kaiserslautern.

Honours
 Bundesliga champion: 1977–78, 1990–91
 Bundesliga runner-up: 1981–82, 1993–94
 DFB-Pokal winner: 1977–78, 1982–83, 1989–90, 1995–96
 DFB-Pokal finalist: 1979–80

References

External links
 

1959 births
Living people
People from Tauberbischofsheim
Sportspeople from Stuttgart (region)
German footballers
1. FC Köln players
1. FC Köln II players
1. FC Kaiserslautern players
Bundesliga players
2. Bundesliga players
Association football goalkeepers
Footballers from Baden-Württemberg
West German footballers